Simonovo is a rural locality (a village) in Penkinskoye Rural Settlement, Kameshkovsky District, Vladimir Oblast, Russia. The population was 25 as of 2010.

Geography 
Simonovo is located 32 km south of Kameshkovo (the district's administrative centre) by road. Lubenkino is the nearest rural locality.

References 

Rural localities in Kameshkovsky District